Mitogen-activated protein kinase kinase kinase 11 is an enzyme that in humans is encoded by the MAP3K11 gene.

Function 

The protein encoded by this gene is called MLK3 and it is a member of the serine/threonine kinase family. This kinase contains a SH3 domain and a leucine zipper-basic motif. This kinase preferentially activates MAPK8/JNK kinase, and functions as a positive regulator of JNK signaling pathway. This kinase can directly phosphorylate, and activates JNK and p38, and is found to be involved in the transcription activity of AP1 mediated by Rho family GTPases and CDC42.

Interactions 

MAP3K11 has been shown to interact with:
 AKT1,
 CDC42, 
 MAPK8IP1, 
 MAPK8IP2, and
 SH3RF1.

References

Further reading 

 
 
 
 
 
 
 
 
 
 
 
 
 
 
 
 
 

EC 2.7.11